Bartley MRT station is an underground Mass Rapid Transit (MRT) station on the Stage 3 of the Circle line, located on the boundary of Serangoon and Toa Payoh planning areas, Singapore.

Situated along Bartley Road near How Sun Estate, Maris Stella High School and Ramakrishna Mission Singapore, this station serves the residential estate along Serangoon Avenue 1 and the upcoming Bidadari estate.

History

Bartley MRT Station was named after William Bartley, who was Acting Collector-General of Income Tax in the 1920s and President of the Municipal Commission of Singapore between 1931 and 1946.

Contract C851A for the construction and completion of Bartley MRT Station was awarded to Wan Soon Construction Pte Ltd at a sum of S$63.5 million in July 2003.

The station was built in tandem with the Outer Ring Road System project which consists of extending Bartley Road to Eunos Road via a viaduct over the part of the underground site of the Kim Chuan Depot. On 13 August 2003, a section of Bartley Road was realigned for the construction of the station.

As part of the project, Upper Paya Lebar Road was rebuilt and opened on 17 January 2010 as an underpass heading towards MacPherson and Paya Lebar. The station was first opened on 28 May 2009 along with the rest of Stage 3 of the Circle line.

Before the opening of the station, the Singapore Civil Defence Force (SCDF) conducted the third Shelter Open House at this station on 4 April 2009, together with Bishan and Lorong Chuan stations. It also held an open house for the SMRT staff on 1 May 2009. The station was the eastern terminus for the Circle line until Stages 1 and 2 to Dhoby Ghaut opened on 17 April 2010.

Art in Transit
The art piece at this station, which called The Coin Mat, done by Jane Lee, consists of a mural made up of 160,000 one-cent coins embedded in glass.

References

External links
 

Railway stations in Singapore opened in 2009
Railway stations in Serangoon
Mass Rapid Transit (Singapore) stations